Jean Ruth (September 10, 1917 – September 18, 2004) was an American actress and radio personality. As an actress, she is best known for appearing in the Martin and Lewis film At War with the Army (1950). Her radio broadcasts during WWII from 1941-44 were the basis for the musical film Reveille with Beverly. Hay claimed later that while broadcasting she would be asked to read out the names of songs that didn't exist, which served as secret messages to the French Resistance. She also later befriended the famous wartime Japanese-American radio announcer Iva Toguri after she was prosecuted for treason for radio broadcasts from Tokyo. She was married to American swing and boogie-woogie pianist and bandleader Freddie Slack from 1945 to 1948.

Filmography

Film

Television

References

External links 

Rotten Tomatoes profile

1917 births
2004 deaths
Actresses from Philadelphia
American film actresses
20th-century American actresses
University of Colorado alumni
American television actresses